Andrew Graham may refer to:
 Andrew Graham (economist) (born 1942), English academic
 Andrew Graham (astronomer) (1815–1908), Irish astronomer
 Andrew Graham (naturalist) (1730s–1815), Scottish scientist
 Andrew Graham (baseball) (born 1982), Australian baseball player
 Alec Graham (Andrew Alexander Kenny Graham, 1929–2021), Anglican bishop
 Andrew Graham (bishop of Dunblane), Bishop of Dunblane between 1573/1575 and 1603
 Andy Graham (born 1983), Scottish footballer
 Sir Andrew Graham, 5th Baronet (born 1956), British general
 Andrew Graham (politician) (1843–1926), New Zealand politician
 Leth Graham (Andrew Letham Graham, 1893–1944), ice hockey player
 Andrew Graham (Australian footballer) (born 1963), former Australian rules footballer
 Andrew Graham, a character in Mobile Fighter G Gundam

See also
 Andy Grahame (born 1957), speedway rider
 Andrew Graham-Yooll (1944–2019), author
 Andrew Graham-Dixon (born 1960), British art historian